Cardiochiles is a genus of insects belonging to the family Braconidae.

The genus has almost cosmopolitan distribution.

Species:
 Cardiochiles aethiops (Cresson, 1873) 
 Cardiochiles alboannulatus Telenga, 1955

References

Braconidae
Braconidae genera